LaTasha Colander (born August 23, 1976, in Portsmouth, Virginia) is a retired track and field sprinter who competed internationally for the United States.  In 1994, on athletic scholarship, Colander enrolled at, and later graduated from, the University of North Carolina at Chapel Hill.

In 1994, in the 100 m hurdles, Colander was the USA Juniors champion, and placed second in the World Junior Champs.  Yet soon, she switched to sprints.  In 2000 and 2001, she was the U.S. champion in the 400 m.  In April 2000, her team set the women's world record in the 4 × 200 m relay, a record standing over 15 years onward.

In the 2000 Olympics, Colander won a gold medal in the 4 × 400 m relay.  Upon her teammate Marion Jones's 2007 admission of illegal doping, the International Olympic Committee stripped the whole team's medals; in 2010, however, by a successful appeal, all team members except Jones had their medals restored.

Colander missed the 2001 World Championships because of a quadriceps injury.  In 2003, she switched concentration to the 100 m, and won the 2004 US Olympic Trials in this shorter event.  At the 2005 World Championships, she placed fifth in the 200 meters.

In 2000, Colander had established the LC Treasures Within Foundation, its mission to strengthen kids, families, and the world through education, sports, and spirituality.

In 2014, Colander was inducted into the Virginia Sports Hall of Fame.

Achievements

References

External links
 LaTasha Colander at USA Track & Field
 
 
 

1976 births
Living people
American female hurdlers
American female sprinters
Athletes (track and field) at the 2000 Summer Olympics
Athletes (track and field) at the 2004 Summer Olympics
Sportspeople from Portsmouth, Virginia
Track and field athletes from Virginia
North Carolina Tar Heels women's track and field athletes
Woodrow Wilson High School (Portsmouth, Virginia) alumni
African-American female track and field athletes
Medalists at the 2000 Summer Olympics
Olympic gold medalists for the United States in track and field
World Athletics record holders (relay)
USA Outdoor Track and Field Championships winners
21st-century African-American sportspeople
21st-century African-American women
20th-century African-American sportspeople
20th-century African-American women
20th-century African-American people